The Ikopa River is the second longest waterway in Madagascar and passes through the capital, Antananarivo. It is the largest tributary of the Betsiboka River. It is formed by the Varahina-North and Varahina-South Rivers.

Its spring, named Varahina, is found in the sub-prefecture of Andramasina at an altitude of 1810 meters.

References

Rivers of Madagascar
Rivers of Analamanga